West Carteret High School is a public secondary school located in Morehead City, North Carolina on Country Club Road, and is part of the Carteret County Public Schools system. The school serves the student populations of Morehead City, Newport, Atlantic Beach, and surrounding areas. It opened in 1964, and has since grown to be the largest high school in Carteret County. Its school mascot is Pete the Patriot.

West Carteret was recognized by the state of North Carolina in the 2009–2010 school year, and then again in the 2010–2011 school year, as an Honor School of Excellence. This represents the highest ranking possible with at least 90% of students at grade level and making adequate yearly progress (AYP).

In the class year of 2012–2013, West Carteret's Marching Band, the Marching Patriots, were invited to come to Orlando, Florida, to perform in the 2012 Disney Christmas Day Parade on Main Street, and were broadcast on live television December 25, 2012.

Notable alumni 
Lonnie Chisenhall, former MLB third baseman and outfielder
Matt Dodge, former NFL punter
Vaughan Johnson, former NFL linebacker, member of New Orleans Saints Hall of Fame
Chip Peterson, swimmer, specializes in long-distance freestyle swimming, open water swimming world champion
Cooper Webb, professional motocross and supercross racer

References

External links
 

Public high schools in North Carolina
Schools in Carteret County, North Carolina